Spanish succession issue of 1789 was a series of debates and decisions, taking place and adopted prior, during and after the Cortes sittings. They were initiated by king Carlos IV, who suggested that the succession law in force be altered; the change would consist of giving preference to females of main descendant line over males of collateral lines. The proposal was accepted and formally adopted as Cortes’ petition to the king, but a corresponding law was not published until 1830, which triggered a dynastical conflict and a series of civil wars. The question whether the succession law was effectively changed in 1789 turned into a heated juridical, historical and political debate and continued well into the 20th century. In current historiography it is usually considered of secondary importance and dealt with in highly ambiguous terms.

Background

Carlos IV assumed the throne of Spain in December 1788 according to standard succession rules. In May 1789, he issued circular letters which convened the Cortes; the single declared purpose was to take the oath of allegiance to the heir to the throne, Prince Fernando, at the time 5 years old and the older one of two living sons of Carlos IV. The procedure was completely routine. The absolutist Borbonic rule even stripped Cortes of its fiscal prerogatives, and the formality of taking oath to the heir was the key reason why the diet used to meet few times across the 18th century. However, the circulars enjoined also to see that the deputies, at that time called procuradores, were to be provided with sufficient powers to discuss and conclude unspecified other matters in case they should be proposed.

In the late 18th century, the Spanish Cortes Generales consisted of 70-odd members, delegated according to different local procedures, including elections, by councils of municipalities entitled to representation. Those deputies started to arrive in Madrid in the summer, but the diet formally met for the first time on September 19, 1789. The deputies were addressed by the king, who confirmed principal objective of the convocation, adding also that they would "treat and conclude other matters". Once the king had withdrawn, the president of the Cortes, Count of Campomanes, informed the gathering that the Cortes would remain open also after the ceremony of taking oath; the purpose was specified vaguely as "to take measures respecting the Law of Succession".

The procuradores gathered again on September 23, when the pompous and solemn ceremony of swearing allegiance to prince Fernando took place as planned in the church of San Gerónimo in Madrid. Another week passed on as deputies were attending various religious or royal feasts without the Cortes having been convened. However, at least once, on September 28, the king met with Campomanes and Count of Floridablanca, head of Junta Suprema de Estado and effectively the prime minister of Spain. The three discussed disturbing news about ongoing events in France, but they also pondered planned changes to the law of succession, apparently the issue which had already been discussed earlier. The king, the prime minister and the Cortes president decided to launch the procedure of altering the succession regulations at the first Cortes session; they agreed also that it must be kept secret.

September 30, 1789: succession law proceeded

The deputies formally met again in Sala de los Reinos of the Buen Retiro palace on September 30, either early or late morning. With one minor exception which did not affect legality of the proceedings, almost all deputies entitled were present. The president informed the gathering that the king expected them to take a strict oath of secrecy before the proceedings should start. The text, apparently pre-prepared, was read by the president; it specified that all the convened would never disclose anything to be discussed unless permitted by the king or by the president. The deputies acknowledged it with the collegial "amen". None of the sources consulted specifies whether the secret mode of proceeding was exceptional, unusual or customary in the Cortes of that time.

Afterwards the president read to the chamber a text of royal proposal; its essence was that the 1713 succession regulations, which barred females from inheriting the throne save for extraordinary circumstances, be replaced with original Spanish medieval rules, which in terms of succession did not distinguish between sexes. The text noted that the 1713 rules had been born out of circumstances which no longer existed, that they were incompatible with traditional Spanish customs, and that they had resulted in numerous conflicts, having been a threat to peace. The proposal was then followed by reading out a pre-prepared draft of a petition, to be adopted by the Cortes and directed to the king. Its 2-paragraph text was relatively brief; it proposed that the king orders publication of a law which ordains that "Law 2, Title 15, Partida 2" is observed notwithstanding the changes introduced in later "Law 5, Title 7, Book 5". The former, known as Ley de Partida, was the succession law of medieval statutory code; the latter was the 1713 regulation which established new succession rules upon Borbonic assumption of the Spanish throne, usually referred to as "Semi-salic law" or "Salic law".

There is no information available whether the proposal of such a fundamental change came as a shock to the deputies, whether it merely surprised them, or whether it was anticipated and caused no excitement at all. The only record available states that the next to speak was Marqués de Villacampo, as the Burgos deputy traditionally speaking for the chamber; in name of the house he expressed concurrence. The petition was then signed by all deputies and placed in the hands of Campomanes for further proceedings. The gathering briefly discussed a number of other minor unrelated issues, and around 12 AM the session was closed. According to the present-day historian the debate on succession was "a matter of minutes".

October 1789: further proceedings

The Cortes met again on October 3, 1789, when the record of September 30 proceedings was read and agreed to; there is no information of any discussion or difference of opinions having taken place. Four days later, on October 7, 1789, the Cortes petition was inspected by the Catholic hierarchs, gathered earlier to assist in the ceremony of taking oath. In presence of Conde de Floridablanca, 14 bishops and archbishops acknowledged the proposal with their own document, which fully endorsed the changes suggested and recommended that "original and natural order is re-established".

At an unspecified time in October the petition was also reviewed on one or few meetings of a body named Junta de Asistentes de Cortes, serving as a board providing non-binding legal opinion. In a separate address to the king, dated October 30, 1789, the Junta also fully endorsed the Cortes proposal. At an unspecified time the address was acknowledged with written royal assent, also dated October 30, declaring "resolution corresponding to the accompanying petition" and enjoining that greatest secrecy be observed.

Following the October 3 session the diet met on 5 other days, always discussing issues unrelated to the succession question: the agenda was almost entirely about agrarian regime, principally about huge landholdings named mayorazgos, their fiscal obligations and hereditary rules. Some authors claim that as the news of the events unfolding in Paris arrived in Madrid, fearing unrest Campomanes dissolved the Cortes on October 17, which would have ended abruptly. Authors of detailed studies claim that the Cortes proceedings went on as planned.

On October 31, 1789 the chamber met again; during the sitting the president informed the deputies that the king answered all petitions delivered. As to the succession issue, the procuradores were informed that the original petition had been appended with the royal resolution, stating that "I will ordain those of my Council to issue the Pragmatic Sanction which in such cases is expedient and customary, bearing in mind your petition and the opinions thereof taken". During the same meeting of October 31 the deputies once again acknowledged the king's special injunction, pledged to observe it, and formally renewed their oath of secrecy. The written record of the session notes also that they expressed the wish that the succession law be secured in substance and in manner "until the publication of the Pragmática took place, at such time as H. M. might think proper". The same day Campomanes announced the king's intention to close the Cortes on November 5. The meeting was terminated and the deputies re-convened as planned 6 days later, when in presence of the king the Cortes was formally dissolved as "having met its objectives".

Afterwards

Routine legislative procedure envisioned that once a law is approved, it is made public by printing out an appropriate document; however, no law on changing succession rules was published, be it as Ley Fundamental, Pragmática Sanción, Auto Acordado or in any other format. The periodical re-edition of an updated set of key legislation, published in 1805, known as Novisima Recopilación and confirmed by Carlos IV, in terms of succession to the throne referred to the 1713 rule and contained no information on any alteration. Upon abdication of Carlos IV in 1808 the throne was assumed by his son, Fernando VII; as he had no issue no ceremony similar to the 1789 taking of oath took place. The revolutionary Constitution of Cádiz, issued in 1812, did not distinguish between sexes in terms of royal hereditary rights; it contained no official reference to the 1789 Cortes, though Junta Suprema of the Cádiz gathering was aware of its proceedings. Once Fernando VII returned to power in 1813 the pre-revolutionary status quo ante was restored, though with no specific reference to succession law. The deposed Carlos IV died in 1819. As Fernando VII turned 40 and still had no issue, in the 1820s it was widely understood that in case he dies with no son, the throne would pass to his younger brother, Don Carlos. There were no participants of the 1789 Cortes alive when on March 29, 1830, Fernando VII issued a document styled as publication of the 1789 succession law.

The 1830 document briefly referred the events of 1789 and noted that turbulent times did not allow "execution of those important designs"; it also claimed that with peace and tranquility fully restored, the "Pragmática-sanción" of 1789 is now being published and promulgated. The document, also named "Pragmática Sanción", was published along a few others, signed by Minister of Justice. Certified as based on original documentation stored in the ministry archive, they detailed the events of 1789 and until today they remain the key if not the only source on the succession debate during the Cortes of Charles IV.

The 1830 regulation was rendering also a would-be daughter of Fernando VII a potential heir to the throne. At the moment of its publication the document seemed pointless, as the king had no children at all and the throne was expected to pass to Don Carlos anyway. However, in May 1830 it was announced that the queen was pregnant, and in October 1830 she gave birth to a daughter. At this point the 1830 document would have relegated Don Carlos to the second-in-succession; he refused to recognize its legality and the dynastic crisis ensued. As it overlapped with political conflict between pro-liberal and anti-liberal groupings, the crisis turned into an open conflict, resulting in a series of civil wars which kept rocking the country and lingered until the 20th century.

Was the 1713 law changed?

Though proceedings of the 1789 Cortes have been consigned into nearly perfect oblivion for the lifetime of almost one generation, starting the 1830s they turned into the point of extremely heated political, juridical and historical debate. The question of what had actually been decided, and more specifically whether the 1789 Cortes abrogated the 1713 succession law, became perhaps the most controversial constitutional issue in the 19th century Spain. In the 1830s "rivers of ink" were spilled over the problem, taking shape of countless booklets, leaflets and press articles, produced by those claiming the 1713 law had been changed in 1789 or it had been not. The debate continued during the following decades, recording another climax in the late 1860s and early 1870s. In the 1880s and afterwards the question was eclipsed by a number of ongoing juridical issues and became a historical rather than a legal one, though debates persisted well into the 20th century, animated mostly by longevity of Carlism.

The opinion that the 1789 Cortes had not altered the 1713 regulations seems to support dynastic claims of Don Carlos and his followers; hence, scholars holding such opinion are usually either auto-defined or labeled as Carlists. They quote an enormous list of arguments supposed to prove their point: the key one is that as the 1789 accord between the Cortes and king was not formally published as a law, it did not enter into force. Other arguments, some of them contradictory, claim that deputies were not legally entitled to discuss the issue as their lacked a so-called mandato imperativo, that Campomanes abused the will of Carlos IV, that according to the lex retro non agit rule the law could have not affected Don Carlos, who was already 1 year old in 1789, that proceedings would have been legal prior, but not after swearing allegiance to prince Fernando, that Carlos IV has never formally endorsed the Cortes petition, that there is no such thing as "secret laws", that Novisima Recopilación of 1805 confirmed binding legal status of the 1713 regulations, that the 1789 draft could have been declared law until 1808 but no later, as Cortes entitled only Carlos IV, and not his successors, to make it binding, that most documentation on 1789 events was released in 1830 and could have been tampered with, that the whole process was sort of a coup agreed between Floridablanca and Campomanes, and other points.

The opinion that the 1789 Cortes had altered the 1713 succession law supported the dynastic claim of Fernando's descendants; hence, scholars holding such opinion were usually deemed Cristinos, Isabellinos or Alfonsinos. They repudiated arguments pointing to non-binding legal character of the 1789 events; the key line of reasoning was that Carlos IV in full agreement with the Cortes adopted a new law, and publication was a minor technical issue. They advance other claims, some of them also contradictory: that deputies were specifically asked to come equipped with powers to discuss all issues, that the law was not applied retroactively as Fernando's daughter Isabel had not been born at the time, that Carlos IV formally approved of the Cortes petition, that author of Novisima Recopilación was not aware of the 1789 law, and that Fernando as the son of Carlos IV inherited also the right to publish the law at the time he deemed proper. Some claim that the law entered into force in 1789 and refer to "Pragmatic Sanction of Carlos IV/of 1789", some claim that it entered into force upon publication in 1830 and refer to "Pragmatic Sanction of Fernando VII/of 1830", some refer to both.

Other questions

Apart from the problem of legally binding or non-binding nature of the 1789 events, there are other questions related. The two which stand out are the motives for launching the procedure of changing the 1713 law and the motives for keeping the process and its outcome secret.

Many scholars suggest that the initiative should be considered against the broad background of foreign policy, mostly though not exclusively related to a would-be union with Portugal. In September 1788 prince João, upon the unexpected death of his older brother, became heir to the Portuguese throne, and his wife Carlota Joaquina, daughter of Carlos IV, became a queen-in-waiting. Her assumption of the Spanish throne would enable a Spanish-Portuguese union, a constant objective of Spanish foreign policy since medieval times. Another important motive speculated upon was ensuring succession to descendants of Carlos IV. In 1789 he had 4 daughters, aged 14, 10, 7 and a 2-month baby, plus two sons, aged 5 and 1. He also experienced earlier death of his 4 other sons, who had died at the age of 3, 3, 1 and 1. It is supposed that fearing potential death of his remaining sons, still in early infancy, Carlos IV intended to secure succession to his daughters, who had already grew out of the very dangerous early age. One more motive would have been that the 1713 law limited succession to males born in Spain; with Carlos IV born in Naples, it might have served as a remote yet usable legal claim against his rule. Finally, some historians point to intentions of re-establishing traditional Spanish regulations just for the sake of their traditional nature.

Nuances of foreign policy are also usually quoted as motives for keeping the proceedings secret; it is supposed that Carlos IV feared adverse reaction of the courts in Paris and Naples, especially that when the news of 1789 agreement leaked out despite the renewed secrecy oath, both monarchs protested to Madrid. Following outbreak of the Revolution, France was deemed unpredictable and Carlos IV is seen as determined to avoid provoking his northern neighbor. There are also scholars who suspect that Carlos IV from the onset intended to apply or not to apply the 1789 rule depending upon the circumstances, and that secrecy allowed him more room for maneuvering. Finally, some authors admit that reasons for keeping the decision secret are unclear.

Other questions related to the 1789 Cortes are less fundamental and mostly remain open. Was the 1789 Cortes routine or exceptional? To what extent the procedure was inspired by ilustrados and other proponents of a new line? Did the Cortes strengthen or weaken the absolutist position of the king? To what extend Floridablanca and Campomanes influenced the Cortes? Who was the moving spirit behind the attempt to alter the succession law: Floridablanca, queen Maria Luisa, Carlos IV? Did the deputies adopt royal proposal swiftly and unanimously because they appreciated the motives, because they were servile or for some other reason?

Current historiographic reading

Though the object of heated debate in the 19th century, today the question of succession law of 1789 generates little interest among professional historians; the last identified dedicated monograph comes from 1978. Some authors consider the succession issue the only important point of the 1789 Cortes, some discuss it as a minor problem, second to questions of rural rent, mayorazgos and other agrarian issues. In some syntheses the 1789 debate is not at all noted in chapters dedicated to Carlos IV, only briefly referred to when discussing the 1830 document of Fernando VII. In general, most historians tend to avoid normative pronouncements on the 1789 process, though wording used in different works can vary enormously and might suggests distinct interpretations.

One group of works sort of imply that in 1789 the succession law was effectively changed. There are authors who claim that Carlos IV decreed the Pragmatic Sanction, though he kept it secret; others tend to agree vaguely that the 1713 law was effectively altered in 1789, though the decision was not published. Another group of works is fathered by students who wrote highly ambiguous paragraphs; some note that the 1713 law was indeed changed in 1789, but the decision was put into effect in 1830, some point that the 1713 law "was modified during the reign of Carlos IV" but also that the new regulation was promulgated in 1830; some claim that Carlos IV did not promulgate a corresponding law, but at the same time refer to "Pragmatic Sanction of Carlos IV". Yet another group of authors mention neither any "law of 1789" nor "changing the 1713 law", but prefer to dwell upon the Cortes approving of the draft, upon Carlos IV "returning to traditional law", upon procuradores agreeing the petition, upon Cortes "registering the proposal" etc. Finally, there are historians who more or less clearly suggest that the new law was "formulated" or "agreed" in 1789, but it did not enter into force at that time; this is the position shared also by most historians related to Carlism, though these add also that neither the 1830 promulgation was legally binding. The author of the latest monograph on the issue adopts one more perspective, namely that the 1789 events should not be viewed in isolation but analyzed as one of 8 phases, starting with the law of 1713 and ending with the decree of 1832.

See also

 Carlism
 Alfonsism
 succession regulations of 1713
 succession regulations of 1830

Footnotes

Further reading

 Jesús Longares Alonso, Las últimas Cortes del Antiguo Régimen en España (19 septiembre - 5 diciembre [sic!] de 1789), [in:] Estudis: Revista de historia moderna 3 (1974), pp. 113–165
 Rosario Prieto, Las Cortes de 1789: el orden sucesorio, [in:] Vicente Palacio Atard, Manuel Espadas Burgos (eds.), Estudios sobre el siglo XVIII, Madrid 1978, pp. 261–342
 set of documents on 1789 proceedings, released 1830s

1789 in Spain
Carlism